Diisoheptyl phthalate is a phthalate used as a plasticizer.  Diisoheptyl phthalate is typically a mixture of chemical compounds consisting of various isoheptyl esters of phthalic acid with the chemical formula C22H34O4.

See also
 Diisononyl phthalate

References

Phthalate esters